BD1031 or (R)-2-[2-(3,4-dichlorophenyl)ethyl]octahydropyrrolo[1,2-a]pyrazine is a selective sigma receptor agonist, with a reported binding affinity of Ki = 1 ± 0.2 nM for the sigma-1 receptor and 80 times selectivity over the sigma-2 receptor. The enantiomer of BD1031 is known as BD1018.

Consistent with other reported sigma receptor agonists, BD1031 increases the behavioural toxicity of cocaine in Swiss Webster mice.

See also
 BD1008

References

Sigma agonists